The Ohio Wing (OHWG) of the Civil Air Patrol (CAP) is the highest echelon of CAP in the state of Ohio. The Ohio Wing headquarters are located in Columbus at the Defense Supply Center, Columbus. The wing is a member of the Great Lakes Region of the CAP.

History
The Ohio Wing's foundation corresponds with the late 1930s movement to organize civilian aviation for domestic defense. In 1940 in Toledo, Milton Knight organized a Civil Air Reserve unit. After taking office in 1939, Governor John W. Bricker appointed Cleveland resident Earle L. Johnson as Director of the Ohio Bureau of Aeronautics. A graduate of the Ohio State University, Johnson's interest in aviation began in the mid-1920s thanks to his neighbor and Cleveland native David Ingalls, the only United States Navy fighter ace from World War I.  While working for Governor Bricker, Johnson in September 1941 organized Ohio's civilian pilots into a state Civil Air Defense wing. When the federal Office of Civilian Defense (OCD) established the Civil Air Patrol in December 1941, the state Civil Air Defense wing evolved into a CAP wing, with Johnson serving as the first wing commander. In March 1942, Johnson entered active army service and succeeded Major General John F. Curry as the national commander of the CAP, a position he held until his death in 1947.

The Ohio Wing grew rapidly following the onset of the war.  Governor Bricker joined CAP in May 1942, as did Congressman John M. Vorys, himself a World War I naval aviator and former director of the Ohio Bureau of Aeronautics. By July 1942, the wing numbered 3,282 men and women organized in nine groups and 39 squadrons, making the Ohio Wing the third largest CAP wing in the nation; over 4,200 members served in the Ohio Wing by 31 October 1942. Ohio squadrons undertook a variety of missions on behalf of the war effort, including searches for scrap metal, aerial patrol over the state's valuable timber resources, preventing large forest fires from erupting, surveillance of coal, oil, and gas resources, patrolling flood-stricken areas across the state, and served as aerial couriers during the war.

Ohio, far removed from the U-boat menace, resolved to contribute to the coastal patrol effort. In July 1942, Vorys made an open request for volunteers to help form an all-Ohio CAP Coastal Patrol base, which was authorized on July 16, 1942, by the activation of Coastal Patrol Base No. 14 at Panama City, Florida. Aircrews spotted oil slicks, debris, reported suspected U-boats, remains of crashed aircraft, and anything out of the ordinary. They assisted in the rescue of shipwreck survivors, reported sinking or suspicious vessels to the military, and ensured that the valuable tankers and supply vessels leaving ports in the Gulf made their way safely to military forces in Europe and the Pacific.

Since World War II, the Ohio Wing has continued to prosper, developing scores of young men and women into model citizens and future personnel in the armed forces. Members of the wing have assisted in the rescue of downed aviators, provided assistance to state and national officials in natural disasters and local emergencies, and proudly represented the Birthplace of Aviation by promoting Ohio's aviation resources and heritage.

In January 2009, members of the Ohio Wing, along with CAP members from the Indiana, Illinois, and Kentucky Wings, flew sorties surveying damage and boosting communications for the Kentucky National Guard following a severe ice storm in Kentucky, while CAP ground crews assisted National Guardsmen in going door to door to perform wellness checks on residents.

Annual encampment
The Ohio Wing holds a cadet encampment annually. Serving as a weeklong training camp for cadets, the encampment involves instruction in discipline, teamwork, and leadership.  Other activities involve instruction in drill and ceremonies, customs and courtesies, basic CAP knowledge and military tradition. Encampment attendance is a prerequisite for the Gen. Billy Mitchell Award. Senior members may also be awarded the ribbon for providing leadership at CAP this encampment.  The encampment is held at Wright-Patterson Air Force Base in Dayton, Ohio.

Groups and squadrons

Wing commanders

* denotes commanders who have gone on to become the national commander of the Civil Air Patrol.

See also
Ohio Air National Guard
Ohio Army National Guard
Ohio Military Reserve
Ohio Naval Militia

References

External links

Wings of the Civil Air Patrol
Military in Ohio
Education in Ohio